Old Government House may refer to:

 Old Government House, Parramatta, Australia
 Old Government House, Queensland, Australia
 Old Government House, South Australia, Australia
 Old Government House, Hobart, Australia
 Old Government House, Fredericton, Canada
 Old Government House, Auckland, New Zealand
 Old Government House (Augusta, Georgia), USA

See also
 Old City Hall (disambiguation)
 Old Town Hall (disambiguation)